Phallomedusa solida is a species of small, air-breathing land snail with an operculum, a pulmonate gastropod mollusc in the family Phallomedusidae.

In 2007, a publication by Golding, Ponder, and Byrne recombined Salinator solida as Phallomedusa solida and moved it to a new family, the Phallomedusidae.

Distribution
This species lives on the eastern and southern coasts of Australia, in the states of Queensland, New South Wales, Victoria, Tasmania, South Australia, and Western Australia.

Habitat
This snail lives in semi-marine conditions, being found most commonly in mangroves, salt-marshes and mud flats.

Life habits
These snails feed on detritus.

References

Phallomedusidae
Gastropods described in 1878